Ruslan Gadzhimagomedovich Magomedov (born 26 November 1986 in Dagestan) is a Russian mixed martial artist, who competes in the Heavyweight division. Magomedov was the first UFC fighter to receive lifetime ban from USADA after sustaining his third anti-doping violation in February 2019. He is ranked #8 in the ACA heavyweight rankings.

Mixed martial arts career

Early career
Magomedov was born in village Tsudakhar, Levashinsky District, Dagestan, Russia. He is an ethnic Dargin and a devout Sunni Muslim. At the age of eight he began to train in Karate, Amateur boxing and Muay Thai under Igor Ivanov. After higher school, he joined the Russian Army Strategic Missile Troops in Yekaterinburg and Irkutsk, in the army he won national Army hand-to-hand fight championships, he is Second lieutenant, after the army he started MMA.

Magomedov made his professional MMA debut in November 2008 and went 9-1 in his first 10 fights.

Ruslan trains in Russian MMA Academy. He sparred with Olympic Wrestling Champions from the Dagestan Republic. Ruslan has shown good boxing technique, as he has four victories coming by way of knockout.

He defeated former UFC Heavyweight Champion Ricco Rodriguez via unanimous decision at United Glory 15.

Bellator MMA
In April 2012, Ruslan signed a contract with Bellator Fighting Championships.

Magomedov was expected to compete in the Bellator season seven heavyweight tournament, and was expected to face Brett Rogers in the quarterfinals at Bellator 75. However, Magomedov was forced out of the bout with a visa problems and replaced by Alexander Volkov.

Fight Nights MMA
Magomedov faced Strikeforce veteran and Cage Warriors Heavyweight Champion Mike Hayes on February 23, 2013 on Fight Nights: Battle of Moscow 10. He won via unanimous decision.

Magomedov faced former UFC Heavyweight Champion Tim Sylvia on October 27, 2013 on Fight Nights: Battle of Moscow 13. He won the fight via unanimous decision.

Ultimate Fighting Championship
In February 2014, Magomedov signed a contract with the UFC to fight in their Heavyweight division.

Magomedov made his UFC debut against fellow newcomer Viktor Pešta on May 31, 2014 at UFC Fight Night 41. By this time, Magomedov was splitting his training between the MMA Academy in Russia and Jackson/Winklejohn MMA in Albuquerque, USA. He won the fight by unanimous decision.

Magomedov was briefly linked to a bout with Ben Rothwell for on August 30, 2014 at UFC 177. However, on July 9, the UFC announced Rothwell would be facing Alistair Overeem on September 5, 2014 at UFC Fight Night 50.
Magomedov eventually was linked to a bout with Richard Odoms on the same card. However, on August 14, it was announced that the bout would be scrapped due to an injury from Odoms.

Magomedov faced Josh Copeland on November 22, 2014 at UFC Fight Night 57. He won the fight via unanimous decision.

Magomedov faced Shawn Jordan on October 3, 2015 at UFC 192. He won via unanimous decision.

Magomedov was expected to face Gabriel Gonzaga on April 10, 2016 at UFC Fight Night 86. However, Magomedov was forced from the bout in early March due to injury and replaced by Derrick Lewis.

Magomedov was expected to face Stefan Struve on October 8, 2016 at UFC 204, but had to pull out with injury.

On September 26, 2016 Magomedov was suspended by USADA, the administrator of the UFC anti-doping program following a potential Anti-Doping Policy violation stemming from an out-of-competition sample collection made on September 7, 2016 In February 2018, it was announced that Magomedov had received a two years USADA suspension after testing positive for ostarine in relation to a sample collected in October 29, 2016. In addition, Magomedov along with teammate Zubaira Tukhugov agreed to pay a total of 10,000 US Dollars towards arbitration costs.

Magomedov was scheduled to face Marcos Rogerio de Lima on November 3, 2018 at UFC 230. However, it was reported on October 24, 2018 that he pulled out from the event due to visa issues and he was replaced by Adam Wieczorek.

In April 2019, Magomedov received a lifetime ban from USADA after sustaining his second and third violations under the policy. Magomedov tested positive for two anabolic steroids in October 2018 and then in February 2019 refused to complete the sample collection process as requested by a doping control officer during an out-of-competition test session.

Post-UFC career
After the ban, Magomedov signed with the Absolute Championship Akhmat. He made his promotional debut against Daniel James at ACA 101: Strus vs. Nemchinov on November 15, 2019. He won the fight via unanimous decision.

He made his sophomore appearance against Dmitry Poberezhets at ACA 115: Magomed Ismailov vs. Shtyrkov on December 12, 2020. He was knocked out cold in the third round.

Magomedov faced Denis Smoldarev on July 16, 2021 at ACA 126: Magomedov vs. Egemberdiev. He lost the bout via split decision.

Mixed martial arts record

|-
|Loss
|align=center| 15–3
|Denis Smoldarev
|Decision (split)
|ACA 126: Magomedov vs. Egemberdiev
|
|align=center|3
|align=center|5:00
|Sochi, Russia
|
|-
|Loss
|align=center| 15–2
|Dmitry Poberezhets
|KO (punches)
|ACA 115: Magomed Ismailov vs. Shtyrkov
|
|align=center|3
|align=center|0:30
|Moscow, Russia
|
|-
|Win
|align=center| 15–1
|Daniel James
|Decision (unanimous)
|ACA 101: Strus vs. Nemchinov
|
|align=center|3
|align=center|5:00
|Warsaw, Poland
|
|-
|Win
|align=center| 14–1
|Shawn Jordan
|Decision (unanimous)
|UFC 192
|
|align=center|3
|align=center|5:00
|Houston, Texas, United States
|
|-
|Win
|align=center|13–1
|Josh Copeland
|Decision (unanimous)
|UFC Fight Night: Edgar vs. Swanson
|
|align=center|3
|align=center|5:00
|Austin, Texas, United States
|
|-
|Win
|align=center|12–1
|Viktor Pešta
|Decision (unanimous)
|UFC Fight Night: Munoz vs. Mousasi
|
|align=center|3
|align=center|5:00
|Berlin, Germany
|
|-
|Win
|align=center|11–1
|Tim Sylvia
|Decision (unanimous)
|Fight Nights: Battle of Moscow 13
|
|align=center|3
|align=center|5:00
|Moscow, Russia
|
|-
|Win
|align=center|10–1
|Mike Hayes
|Decision (unanimous)
|Fight Nights: Battle of Moscow 10
|
|align=center|3
|align=center|5:00
|Moscow, Russia
|
|-
|Win
|align=center|9–1
|Amir Aliskerov
|Decision (unanimous)
|Dictator Fighting Championship 1
|
|align=center|2
|align=center|5:00
|Moscow, Russia
|
|-
|Win
|align=center|8–1
|Igor Zadernovsky
|Submission (guillotine choke)
|League S-70: Russian Championship Third Round
|
|align=center|3
|align=center|3:29
|Moscow, Russia
|
|-
|Win
|align=center|7–1
|Ricco Rodriguez
|Decision (unanimous)
|United Glory 15: 2012 Glory World Series
|
|align=center|3
|align=center|5:00
|Moscow, Russia
|
|-
|Win
|align=center|6–1
|Vitalii Yalovenko
|Decision (unanimous)
|Fight Nights: Battle of Moscow 4
|
|align=center|2
|align=center|5:00
|Moscow, Russia
|
|-
|Loss
|align=center|5–1
|Konstantin Gluhov
|TKO (body punch)
|Warrior's Honor 3
|
|align=center|2
|align=center|1:19
|Kharkiv, Ukraine
|
|-
|Win
|align=center|5–0
|Vagan Bodzhukyan
|TKO (punches)
|Warrior's Honor 3
|
|align=center|2
|align=center|3:12
|Kharkiv, Ukraine
|
|-
|Win
|align=center|4–0
|Anatoliy Nosyrev
|Submission (armbar)
|ProFC - Union Nation Cup 14
|
|align=center|1
|align=center|0:28
|Rostov-on-Don, Russia
|
|-
|Win
|align=center|3–0
|Magomedtagir Magomedov
|TKO (punches)
|ProFC 22
|
|align=center|1
|align=center|1:30
|Rostov-on-Don, Russia
|
|-
|Win
|align=center|2–0
|Murad Magomedov
|TKO (punches)
|ProFC: Russia Cup Stage 1
|
|align=center|1
|align=center|2:30
|Taganrog, Russia
|
|-
|Win
|align=center|1–0
|Rasul Musrailov
|TKO (doctor stoppage)
|ProFC: Russia Cup Stage 1
|
|align=center|1
|align=center|3:43
|Taganrog, Russia
|

Filmography

See also
 List of current UFC fighters
 List of male mixed martial artists

References

External links
Official UFC Profile

Living people
1986 births
Dargwa people
Dagestani mixed martial artists
Heavyweight mixed martial artists
Sportspeople from Makhachkala
Russian Muslims
Russian expatriates in the United States
Russian male mixed martial artists
Mixed martial artists utilizing Muay Thai
Mixed martial artists utilizing karate
Mixed martial artists utilizing boxing
Mixed martial artists utilizing wrestling
Mixed martial artists utilizing ARB
Doping cases in mixed martial arts
Russian Muay Thai practitioners
Russian male karateka
Ultimate Fighting Championship male fighters